This a list of shipwrecks located in Australia.

New South Wales

Norfolk Island

Northern Territory

Queensland

South Australia

Tasmania

Victoria

Western Australia

See also
 Australian National Shipwreck Database
 HMAS Hobart (D39)
 List of unidentified shipwrecks in Australian waters
 List of 17th-century shipwrecks in Australia
 Ship graveyard#Australia

References

Further reading
 Loney, J. K. (1993). Wrecks on the New South Wales Coast. Oceans Enterprises. .
 Bateson, Charles; Reed, AH; Reed, AW (1972). Australian Shipwrecks – Vol. 1 1622–1850. Sydney.   
 Loney, J. K. (1980). Australian Shipwrecks Vol. 2 1851–1871. Sydney. 
 Loney, J. K. (1982). Australian Shipwrecks Vol. 3 1871–1900. Geelong, Vic: List Publishing.
 Loney, J. K. (1987). Australian Shipwrecks Vol. 4 1901–1986. Portarlington, Vic: Marine History Publications. 
 Loney, J. K. (1991). Australian Shipwrecks Vol. 5 Update 1986. Portarlington, Vic: Marine History Publications.
 Christopher, P. (2009). Australian Shipwrecks: a pictorial history. Axiom Publishing. Stepney, South Australia.  Reprinted 2012.
Hogarth, Christine (1985) Navigators and Shipwrecks: Australia's heritage in stamps. Melbourne: Australia Post

External links
Australian National Shipwreck Database
Encyclopedia of Australian Shipwrecks

 
 
Shipwrecks
Shipwrecks